Walter Wilson may refer to:

Sports
Walter Wilson (cricketer) (1843-1865), New Zealand cricketer
Walter Wilson (footballer, born 1865) (1865–?), English footballer for Everton
Walter Wilson (footballer, fl. 1894), British 19th century footballer
Walter Bartley Wilson (1870–1954), artist and football manager at Cardiff City
Walter Wilson (wrestler) (1884–?), British Olympic wrestler
Walter Wilson (baseball) (1913–1994), pitcher in Major League Baseball
Walter Wilson (gridiron football) (born 1966), football player

Other
Walter Wilson (biographer) (1781–1847), English biographer of nonconformism
Walter Horatio Wilson (1839–1902), lawyer and politician in the Legislative Assembly of Queensland
Walter Henry Wilson (1839-1904), British ship designer and one of the founding partners of the firm Harland and Wolff
Walter Gordon Wilson (1874–1957), engineer and member of the British Royal Naval Air Service
Walter K. Wilson Jr. (1906–1985), American soldier